Siderolamprus is a genus of lizard in the family Diploglossidae. They are found throughout much of Central America. They are considered the only members of the subfamily Siderolamprinae, although Diploglossus bilobatus is sometimes reclassified into the monotypic genus Mesoamericus and placed with them.

All species in this genus were previously classified in either Celestus or Diploglossus until a 2021 study found members of both groups to form a distinct grouping from any other diploglossid lizards. The genus Siderolamprus was revived for these species.

Species 

 Siderolamprus adercus 
 Siderolamprus atitlanensis  – Atitlán galliwasp
 Siderolamprus bivittatus  – two-banded galliwasp
 Siderolamprus cyanochloris 
 Siderolamprus enneagrammus  – Huaxteca lesser galliwasp

 Siderolamprus hylaius  
 Siderolamprus ingridae  – Ingrid’s galliwasp
 Siderolamprus laf 
 Siderolamprus legnotus  – Campbell's galliwasp
 Siderolamprus montanus  – mountain lesser galliwasp
 Siderolamprus orobius 
 Siderolamprus owenii  – Owen's galliwasp
 Siderolamprus rozellae  – Rozella's lesser galliwasp
 Siderolamprus scansorius

References 

Siderolamprus
Lizard genera
Taxa named by Edward Drinker Cope